Paleacrita longiciliata is a species of geometrid moth in the family Geometridae. It is found in North America.

The MONA or Hodges number for Paleacrita longiciliata is 6664.

References

Further reading

 

Bistonini
Articles created by Qbugbot
Moths described in 1898